Tasmannia vickeriana, the Baw Baw pepper, is native to alpine habitats of Victoria, Australia.

References

vickeriana
Flora of Victoria (Australia)